Noir (stylized as NOIR) is a studio album by American hip hop production duo Blue Sky Black Death. It was released on Fake Four Inc. in 2011.

Release
Noir was originally released on Fake Four Inc. on April 26, 2011. Screwed versions of several of the tracks were released on Blue Sky Black Death's Bandcamp, as Noir + Violet. Later, the group also released a deluxe digital reissue of the album, titled Noir Dlxe, which includes the screwed versions, four alternate tracks from the original Noir release, and three more tracks, for a total of 29 tracks at a length of more than 2 hours.

In 2013, a limited-run two-disc vinyl pressing was done, featuring the original track listing, two alternates, as well as a previously-unreleased track, "Thirteen", which does not appear on the deluxe digital release. It also features a new album cover. It was followed by a later re-pressing in 2014. A 10-year vinyl reissue was announced in March of 2021.

Critical reception

Brett Uddenberg of URB gave the album 4 out of 5 stars, calling it "a brilliant culmination of reverb-coated keys and lush string arrangements". Marc Hogan of Pitchfork gave the album a 7.5 out of 10, writing: "Using an impressively nuanced deployment of strings, piano, and guitar as well as drum loops and hazy synths, the album has a patient, steady beauty, ranging from glowing panoramas evoking M83 to the classical-informed abstraction of Anticon acts like Dosh and Son Lux." Tom Harrison of Alarm described it as "an album of hazy instrumental beats that skirt the boundary between hip hop and electronica." Will Ryan of Beats Per Minute said, "they set out on another scratchy, emotionally momentous odyssey of gigantic synth melodies with a deluge of shape-shifting samples ranging from mournful vocal washes to chirping orchestral arrangements backed by stomping mid-tempo drum programming."

Track listing

Personnel
Credits adapted from liner notes.

 Blue Sky Black Death – instrumentation, arrangement, recording, mixing
 Raised by Wolves – additional musical contributions (1, 2, 4, 5, 7, 9, 11, 12, 13 14)
 Rob Harris – vocals (3, 4, 8)
 Shaprece Renee – vocals (7, 12)
 Alexander Chen – viola (9, 11, 12), vocals (12)
 Tim Green – artwork, layout

References

External links
 
 Noir at Bandcamp

2011 albums
Blue Sky Black Death albums
Fake Four Inc. albums